is a town and municipality in Vestfold in Vestfold og Telemark county, Norway.  The administrative centre of the municipality is the town of Holmestrand.  The town was established as a municipality on 1 January 1838 (see formannskapsdistrikt). The neighboring rural municipality of Botne was merged into the municipality of Holmestrand on 1 January 1964. Sande municipality merged into Holmestrand on January 1, 2020. The municipality of Hof was merged into Holmestrand on January 1, 2018.

The town lies by the Oslofjord and is built beside the water. It was granted municipal status in 1752, but had been a harbour for exporting of timber/lumber since around 1550. It borders the Oslo Fjord in the east, Tønsberg in the south, and it shares a short border with Larvik in the south-west. It is bordered by Viken in the west and north.

Holmestrand is home to Vestfold County's largest lake, Eikeren. It is also Vestfjellet, which is the highest peak in the county.

Name

The Old Norse form of the name was Holmastrand. The first element is the genitive case of holmi which means "(rocky) hill" and the last element is strand which means "shore", "beach", or "strand".

Coat-of-arms
The coat-of-arms is relatively modern, granted on 14 November 1898.  The arms show a silver eagle holding a gold anchor in its left claw and a gold Rod of Asclepius in its right claw all on a red background.  The eagle in the arms is derived from the arms of the merchant Johan Heinrich Tordenskiold, who, in 1819, donated all his fortune to build a school in Holmestrand.  The eagle also gave its name to the main ship of the merchant, which is shown on the breast-shield, the White Eagle. The anchor symbolises the importance of Holmestrand as a harbour town. The snake on the Rod of Asclepius is the symbol of medicine and symbolises the former health spa in Holmestrand that existed in the 18th and 19th centuries.

Ethnic and foreign minority

Geography
Its islands include Langøya.

Transportation
The European route E18 through Vestfold goes to the west around downtown Holmestrand and secondary roads connect the city to this highway.

The railway line Vestfoldbanen runs through the centre of Holmestrand, and the city is served by the station Holmestrand Station.

Notable residents

 Hans Hein Nysom (1767–1831) a Norwegian priest and politician
 Gullik Madsen Røed (1786 in Holmestrand–1857) soldier and farmer, rep. at Norwegian Constitutional Assembly
 Wincentz Thurmann Ihlen (1826 in Holmestrand – 1892) an engineer and industrialist
 Morten Müller (1828 at Christianiafjord – 1911) a Norwegian landscape painter
 Jacob Thurmann Ihlen (1833 in Holmestrand – 1903) a barrister and politician
 Harriet Backer (1845 in Holmestrand – 1932) painter of detailed interior scenes
 Agathe Backer Grøndahl (1847 in Holmestrand – 1907) a Norwegian pianist, music teacher and composer
 Nils Kjær (1870 in Holmestrand – 1924)  a playwright, short story writer and theatre critic
 Signe Heide Steen (1881 in Holmestrand – 1959) a Norwegian actress
 Øivind Lorentzen (1882 in Holmestrand – 1980) a Norwegian shipping magnate
 Ragnhild Sundby (1922 in Hof – 2006) a Norwegian zoologist who specialized in entomology
 Odd Børretzen (1926–2012) author, illustrator, folk singer and artist; lived in Holmestrand
 brothers Ulf Lövaas (born 1947) & Dag Lovaas (born 1953) former motorcycle speedway riders
 Johannes Eick (born 1964 in Eidsfoss) a Norwegian double bass and electric bass guitar player
 Christine Sagen Helgø (born 1968 in Holmestrand), mayor of Stavanger from 2011 to 2019
 Runhild Gammelsæter (born 1976 in Holmestrand) singer and biologist

International relations

Twin towns — Sister cities
The following cities are twinned with Holmestrand:
  Arsuk, Sermersooq, Greenland
  Åland, Finland
  Eiði, Eysturoy, Faroe Islands
  Herning, Region Midtjylland, Denmark
  Husby, Schleswig-Holstein, Germany
  Kangasala, Western Finland, Finland
  Siglufjörður, Eyjafjörður, Iceland
  Vänersborg, Västra Götaland County, Sweden

References

External links

Municipal fact sheet from Statistics Norway

 
Cities and towns in Norway
Municipalities of Vestfold og Telemark